The Church Nunataks are a line of small nunataks  northeast of Mount Smethurst and  southwest of the Stor Hanakken Mountain in Enderby Land. They were plotted from air photos taken from Australian National Antarctic Research Expeditions aircraft in 1957, and named by the Antarctic Names Committee of Australia for S.W. Church, radio officer at Wilkes Station in 1961.

References 

Nunataks of Enderby Land